Howard Elmer Wandrei (24 September 1909 – 5 September 1956) was a United States artist and writer. He wrote over 200 stories that appeared in the magazines Weird Tales, Astounding, Esquire, Black Mask and others. Wandrei wrote under his own name and as by Robert Coley and H.W. Guernsey.

Wandrei is better remembered for his illustrations many of which were included in the books of his brother, Donald Wandrei.

Several collections of Wandrei's stories were announced as forthcoming from Arkham House but were not published by Arkham House.

Fedogan & Bremer has published several collections of Wandrei's stories using some of the same titles as the proposed Arkham House publications.

A photograph of Howard Wandrei can be found at:

Works
 Three Tales (Fedogan & Bremer, 1995)
 Time Burial (Fedogan & Bremer, 1995)
 The Last Pin (F & B Mystery, 1996)
 Saith the Lord (F & B Mystery, 1996) (limited to 250 copies in wrappers; there were also 100 copies hardbound for insertion with the limited edition slipcased state of THE LAST PIN)
 The Eerie Mr. Murphy (Fedogan & Bremer, 2003)

Notes

References

External links

 
 

 

1909 births
1956 deaths
American horror writers
American fantasy writers
American illustrators
American mystery writers
American science fiction writers
Artists from Saint Paul, Minnesota
Writers from Saint Paul, Minnesota
20th-century American novelists
American male novelists
American male short story writers
20th-century American short story writers
20th-century American male writers
Novelists from Minnesota
Weird fiction writers